Presidential elections were held in Georgia on 27 October 2013, the sixth presidential elections since the country's restoration of independence from the Soviet Union in 1991. The last elections in January 2008 resulted in the re-election of Mikheil Saakashvili for his second and final presidential term. Saakashvili was constitutionally barred from running for a third consecutive term.

The elections were held under a two-round system. Giorgi Margvelashvili was elected with a majority of votes in the first round.

Background
The previous presidential elections were held on 5 January 2008 in a polarised political environment following the November 2007 crisis, in response to which President Mikheil Saakashvili, then serving his first term in office, brought forward the elections from the original date in autumn 2008. Saakashvili won the election with 53.47% of the votes in an election described in the Organization for Security and Co-operation in Europe (OSCE) election observation mission report as "the first genuinely competitive post-independence presidential election", which "was in essence consistent with most OSCE and Council of Europe commitments and standards for democratic elections". At the same time, the mission "revealed significant challenges which need to be addressed urgently."

In the October 2012 parliamentary elections, the former ruling party United National Movement (ENM) lost power to the Georgian Dream coalition led by Bidzina Ivanishvili, who became the new Prime Minister.

Upon the inauguration of a new president in 2013, a series of constitutional amendments passed in the Parliament of Georgia from 2010 to 2013 entered into force. The amendments envisaged significant reduction of the president's powers in favour of the Prime Minister.

Candidates
The Georgian Dream coalition named Giorgi Margvelashvili, minister of education and science and deputy prime minister, as their presidential candidate on 11 May.

The candidates for the ENM presidential primaries, announced in June 2013, were former parliamentary speaker David Bakradze, veteran lawmaker and former cabinet minister Giorgi Baramidze, Shota Malashkhia and Zurab Japaridze. All the primaries were won by Bakradze who was announced the presidential candidate.

On 12 June, Nino Burjanadze announced that she would run for president as the nominee of Democratic Movement – United Georgia.

Salome Zourabichvili, former Foreign Minister of Georgia, was denied ballot access due to her dual citizenship. 

In total, 23 candidates contested the election.

Opinion polls
Opinion polls in the run-up to the election showed Margvelashvili to be the frontrunner. Polls varied between showing over 50% support for Margvelashvili and figures indicating the election would go to a second round.

Results
The result of the election was a clear first-round majority for Margvelashvili with 62% of the vote. Bakradze, his nearest rival, polled 22%. Burjanadze came third, with 10% of the vote. No other candidate received more than 3% of the vote. The inauguration of Margvelashvili was on 17 November.

The election saw 47% of eligible voters cast a ballot; this is lower than the 2012 parliamentary election, which saw 61% vote, and the 2008 presidential election, where 54% of voters participated.

By district or municipality

Reactions
Margvelashvili is an ally of Prime Minister Bidzina Ivanishvili, and the result was considered to be a consolidation of Ivanishvili's power. With his appointee elected to the presidency, Ivanishvili has declared his intention to leave his role as Prime Minister, stating that his goals have been achieved.

The election was declared as "clean" and "transparent" by international observers. The OSCE observer mission preliminary stated that the election was "efficiently administered, transparent and took place in an amicable and constructive environment." However, there were some issues noted by observers. International Society for Fair Elections and Democracy, a Georgian election observer group, found "significant shortcomings" regarding invalid ID and voter lists in Batumi, filing 45 complaints. Another group, Transparency International, filed 34 complaints.

International responses
Supranational organizations 
 — Catherine Ashton, the EU High Representative for Foreign Affairs, and Štefan Füle, the Commissioner for Enlargement and European Neighbourhood Policy, released a statement where they congratulated "the Georgian people on this demonstration of their country's strong democratic credentials" and that they "look forward to continued close cooperation with Georgia on our ambitious mutual agenda of political association and economic integration."
States
 — US Department of State release said that they "witnessed another historic day for all Georgians" and an "important step in Georgia's democratic development and its embrace of Euro-Atlantic institutions."
 — Russian Foreign Minister Sergey Lavrov congratulated the Georgian people on the "free and fair election" and expressed his hope that the new government will "adopt a friendly policy toward Russia, one that will take into account the current situation in this complex region."
 — Foreign Minister Carl Bildt congratulated Georgia on "its well-run presidential election and Giorgi Margvelashvili on clearly being the winner."

References

Presidential elections in Georgia (country)
Presidential election
Georgia
Georgia